In electronics and signal processing, a Bessel filter is a type of analog linear filter with a maximally flat group/phase delay (maximally linear phase response), which preserves the wave shape of filtered signals in the passband. Bessel filters are often used in audio crossover systems.

The filter's name is a reference to German mathematician Friedrich Bessel (1784–1846), who developed the mathematical theory on which the filter is based. The filters are also called Bessel–Thomson filters in recognition of W. E. Thomson, who worked out how to apply Bessel functions to filter design in 1949.

The Bessel filter is very similar to the Gaussian filter, and tends towards the same shape as filter order increases. While the time-domain step response of the Gaussian filter has zero overshoot, the Bessel filter has a small amount of overshoot, but still much less than other common frequency-domain filters, such as Butterworth filters. It has been noted that the impulse response of Bessel–Thomson filters tends towards a Gaussian as the order of the filter is increased.

Compared to finite-order approximations of the Gaussian filter, the Bessel filter has better shaping factor, flatter phase delay, and flatter group delay than a Gaussian of the same order, although the Gaussian has lower time delay and zero overshoot.

The transfer function

A Bessel low-pass filter is characterized by its transfer function:

Since  is indeterminate by the definition of reverse Bessel polynomials, but is a removable singularity, it is defined that .

Bessel polynomials

The transfer function of the Bessel filter is a rational function whose denominator is a reverse Bessel polynomial, such as the following:

The reverse Bessel polynomials are given by:

where

Example

The gain is then

This is conventionally called the cut-off frequency.

The phase is

The group delay is

The Taylor series expansion of the group delay is

This is the greatest number of terms that can be set to zero, since there are a total of four coefficients in the third-order Bessel polynomial, requiring four equations in order to be defined.

Digital

As the important characteristic of a Bessel filter is its maximally-flat group delay, and not the amplitude response, it is inappropriate to use the bilinear transform to convert the analog Bessel filter into a digital form (since this preserves the amplitude response but not the group delay).

The digital equivalent is the Thiran filter, also an all-pole low-pass filter with maximally-flat group delay, which can also be transformed into an allpass filter, to implement fractional delays.

See also 

 Bessel function
 Butterworth filter
 Chebyshev filter
 Comb filter
 Elliptic filter
 Group delay and phase delay

References

External links 
Bessel and Linear Phase Filters — Nuhertz
Bessel Filter Constants  — C.R. Bond
Bessel Filters Polynomials, Poles and Circuit Elements — C.R. Bond
Java source code to compute Bessel filter poles

Linear filters
Network synthesis filters
Electronic design